is a former Japanese football player.

Playing career
Sato was born in Sendai on 22 November 1972. After graduating from high school, he joined Sumitomo Metal (later Kashima Antlers) in 1991. Although he played many matches in first season, he could hardly play in the match behind Masaaki Furukawa from 1992. His opportunity to play decreased from 1995, the club won the champions 1996 J1 League. In 1997, he became a regular goalkeeper and the club won the champions J.League Cup and Emperor's Cup. However he could not play in the match behind Daijiro Takakuwa in 1998. He moved to J2 League club Consadole Sapporo. He played as regular goalkeeper, and the club won the champions in 2000 and was promoted to J1 League. However the club was relegated to J2 end of 2002 season and his opportunity to play decreased behind Yosuke Fujigaya in 2003. In September 2003, he moved to Júbilo Iwata. Although he had no opportunity to play in league competition, at 2003 Emperor's Cup, he played all matches and won the champions. He played as regular player in 2004. However the club got Japan national team goalkeeper Yoshikatsu Kawaguchi in 2005 and Sato could hardly play in the match from 2005. He announced his retirement in November 2007. However he came back as player until June 2008 because reserve goalkeeper got hurt.

Club statistics

References

External links

1972 births
Living people
Association football people from Miyagi Prefecture
Japanese footballers
Japan Soccer League players
J1 League players
J2 League players
Kashima Antlers players
Hokkaido Consadole Sapporo players
Júbilo Iwata players
Association football goalkeepers